The Shopaholics is a 2006 Hong Kong romantic comedy film directed by Wai Ka-Fai, and starring Cecilia Cheung, Lau Ching-Wan, Jordan Chan, Ella Koon, and Paula Tsui.

Cast
 Cecilia Cheung
 Lau Ching-Wan
 Jordan Chan
 Ella Koon
 Paula Tsui
 Dennis Law
 Law Kar-ying
 Johnny Lu
 Isabel Chan

External links
 IMDb entry
 loveHKfilm entry
 FarEastFilms entry

Hong Kong comedy films
China Star Entertainment Group films
2006 films
Films directed by Wai Ka-Fai
2006 romantic comedy films
Films with screenplays by Wai Ka-fai
2000s Hong Kong films